Ecumenical Council of Nicea may also refer to:

 The First Council of Nicaea, AD 325
 The Second Council of Nicaea, AD 787